Michel Schwalbé (27 October 1919 – 8 October 2012) was a French violinist of Polish origin.

Biography 
Born in Radom (Poland), Schwalbé studied in his youth with Moritz Frenkel, then continued his studies in Paris and worked with Georges Enesco, Pierre Monteux and Jules Boucherit. He took French citizenship at that time. Then came the war, and Schwalbé being Jewish, fled France in 1942 and settled in Switzerland. He became soloist of the Orchestre de la Suisse Romande in Geneva from 1944 to 1946, then in Lausanne until 1957, when Herbert von Karajan offered him a solo violin position at the Berlin Philharmonic. During his Swiss period, Schwalbé created his own quartet and succeeded Joseph Szigeti at the Conservatoire de musique de Genève. 

Schwalbé died in Berlin on 8 October 2012.

Notable recordings 
 Vivaldi's The Four Seasons, Herbert von Karajan, Berliner Philharmoniker, 1972, Deutsche Grammophon
 Richard Strauss' Also Sprach Zarathustra, Op.30; Herbert von Karajan, Berliner Philharmoniker, 1974, Deutsche Grammophon

References

External links 
 
 Tabellarischer Lebenslauf klassik-heute.de
 Des Meisters erste Geige tagesspiegel.de, 26 October 2009
 Karajans Konzertmeister Nachruf in der FAZ, 11 October 2012
 Michel Schwalbé, musicien français, violoniste berlinois Le Monde (18 October 2012)
 Michel Schwalbé's obituary (The Daily Telegraph)
 Michel Schwalbé's obituary (The Guardian)
 Discography (Discogs)
 Michel Schwalbé - Saint-Saëns Violin Concerto No. 3 in B Minor (1961) (YouTube)

Polish classical violinists
20th-century French male classical violinists
Jewish classical violinists
20th-century Polish Jews
Officers Crosses of the Order of Merit of the Federal Republic of Germany
Recipients of the Order of Leopold II
Chevaliers of the Légion d'honneur
Companions of the Distinguished Service Order
1919 births
People from Radom
2012 deaths